The following is a list of geographical centre points of counties of the United Kingdom. The data has been taken from the Ordnance Survey's "GB Counties - Past and Present" dataset, under an Open Government Licence (OGL). The coordinates were calculated using the centroid function in QGIS.

See also
Centre points of the United Kingdom
Extreme points of Wales

References

External links
Shropshire village could become centre of UK

Geography of the United Kingdom
United Kingdom
United Kingdom geography-related lists